Stigmaphyllon nudiflorum is a species of plant in the Malpighiaceae family. It is endemic to Ecuador.  Its natural habitat is subtropical or tropical dry forests.

References

nudiflorum
Endemic flora of Ecuador
Critically endangered flora of South America
Taxonomy articles created by Polbot